Pterotopteryx synaphodactyla is a moth of the family Alucitidae. It was described by Sergei Alphéraky in 1876. It is found in Russia.

References

Moths described in 1876
Alucitidae